The 2020 Hungaroring FIA Formula 2 round was a pair of motor races involving Formula 2 cars that took place on 18 and 19 July 2020 at the Hungaroring in Mogyoród, Hungary. The event was the third round of the 2020 FIA Formula 2 Championship and ran in support of the 2020 Hungarian Grand Prix.

Classification

Qualifying 

Notes
  - Marino Sato and Roy Nissany received a one-place grid penalty for a tyre usage infraction.

Feature Race

Sprint race

Standings after the event

Drivers' Championship standings

Teams' Championship standings

 Note: Only the top five positions are included for both sets of standings.

See also 
2020 Hungarian Grand Prix
2020 Budapest Formula 3 round

References

External links 

Budapest
Budapest Formula 2